Elisabetta Cocciaretto and Olga Danilović won the title, defeating Andrea Gámiz and Eva Vedder 6–2, 6–3 in the final.

This was the first edition of the tournament.

Seeds

Draw

Draw

References
Main Draw

External links
 WTA website of the tournament

Open Delle Puglie - Doubles